The Sri Lanka Air Force Women's Wing was formed in 1983 which contains the female members of the Sri Lanka Air Force, both airwomen and lady officers. Only unmarried women can join. Members of this wing serve in the same roles as their male counterparts, including combat roles.  Women were first admitted to the Sri Lanka Air Force in 1972 when female officers joined the Volunteer Air Force.  The Women's Wing was formed on 1983 with the assistance of Women's Royal Air Force (Britain). Initially, women could not become pilots.  However, in 1998 women were recruited to train for the elite pilots' wing to replace losses to the Tamil Tigers in their insurgency.  800 women applied for the 33 available places to fly transport planes.
Officers Commanding include:
 Air Vice Marshal G. D. Perera (? – 1 August 2002)
 Group Captain M. H. Karannagoda (2 August 2002 – ?)

The rank insignias for airwomen and lady officers are as same as their male counterparts and all airwomen can reach the rank of Master Warrant Officer which is the highest rank for an airman and also women can get all trades like men; on the other hand lady officers are not promoted more than Air Commodore.

References

Sri Lanka Air Force
Military units and formations of the Sri Lanka Air Force
All-female military units and formations